Don Bosco is a 1988 Italian biographical drama film directed by Leandro Castellani. It depicts real life events of Roman Catholic priest John Bosco.

Cast
Ben Gazzara as Don Giovanni Bosco
Patsy Kensit as Lina
Karl Zinny as Giuseppe
Laurent Terzieff as Mons. Gastaldi 
Piera Degli Esposti as Lina's mother 
Philippe Leroy as Pope Leo XIII
Raymond Pellegrin as Pope Pius IX
Leopoldo Trieste as Don Borel
Edmund Purdom as Urbano Rattazzi 
Rik Battaglia as Marchese Michele Cavour
Silvano Tranquilli

References

External links
 

1988 films
Italian biographical drama films
1980s Italian-language films
1980s biographical drama films
Films about religion
Films about Catholic priests
Films scored by Stelvio Cipriani
1988 drama films
1980s Italian films